The 2015 Carlton Mid Triangular Series was a One Day International cricket tournament held in Australia. It was a tri-nation series between Australia, England and India. Australia defeated England by 112 runs in the final to claim their 20th Australian Tri-Series title.

Unlike previous Australian tri-nation ODI series, each team played the others only twice during the round-robin stage (instead of the typical four times), and the final was staged as a single match rather than as the best-of-three, in order to accommodate the 2015 Cricket World Cup which immediately followed the series. In February 2015 during the Cricket World Cup, India's team director Ravi Shastri criticised the scheduling of the tri-series saying it was a "sheer waste of time and energy."

Squads

1 Australian captain George Bailey was suspended for one match after Match 2 for a slow over-rate. Steve Smith replaced Bailey as captain for Match 4 in Hobart. 
2 David Warner was rested for Match 4 in Hobart; as a result, Shaun Marsh and Cameron White were added to the squad. 
3 Shane Watson was ruled out of Match 4 with hamstring tightness, so Moises Henriques was added to the squad for that match.

Warm-up matches

Round robin

1st Match

2nd Match

3rd Match

4th Match

5th Match

6th Match

Final

Statistics

Most runs

Source:

Most wickets

Source:

See also

 Indian cricket team in Australia in 2014–15

References

External links
Series home at ESPNcricinfo

Australian Tri-Series
2015 in Australian cricket
2015 in Indian cricket
2015 in English cricket
English cricket tours of Australia
International cricket competitions in 2014–15
2015
2014–15 Australian cricket season